Wrap Your Troubles in Dreams is the third studio album by Finnish rock band The 69 Eyes, released in 1997 and produced by Gaga Goodies / Poko Rekords. It was turning point for The 69 Eyes, as they began their transformation from glam metal to gothic rock. Along with their change in musical direction, the band became more popular. It was recently re-released on Cleopatra Records for distribution within the US. The album features a cover song of Call Me, a popular song by the American rock band Blondie.

Track listing 
 "Call Me" (feat. Ville Valo) – 3:50 
 "D.I.D." – 2:57
 "Broken Man" (feat. Ville Valo) – 3:04
 "Get Around" – 3:05
 "Too Much to Lose" – 3:03
 "Sore Loser" – 4:03
 "Skanky Man" – 3:54
 "Wrap Your Troubles in Dreams" – 4:51
 "Hellcity 1999" – 3:16
 "Turbobitch" – 3:33
 "L8R S8N" – 4:24

Singles
Call Me
 "Call Me" (Edit)
 "Broken Man"
 "Wrap Your Troubles in Dreams"

Personnel
Jyrki 69 – vocals
Bazie – lead guitar
Timo-Timo – rhythm guitar
Archzie – bass
Jussi 69 – drums

Notes
The title track "Wrap Your Troubles In Dreams" was re-recorded and included on the American release of the 2007 album Angels.
The song "Too Much to Lose" is a tribute to the late Claude (1966–1996) from the Finnish band Smack.

1997 albums
The 69 Eyes albums